Hamish Schreurs (born 23 January 1994) is a New Zealand cyclist, who last rode for UCI Professional Continental team .

Major results

2015
 1st  Road race, National Under-23 Road Championships
2016
 National Road Championships
1st  Under-23 road race
3rd Road race
3rd Under-23 time trial
 1st  Overall Carpathian Couriers Race
1st  Points classification
1st  Sprints classification
1st Prologue & Stage 3
 3rd Paris–Roubaix Espoirs
 5th Overall Okolo Slovenska
1st  Young rider classification

References

External links

1994 births
Living people
New Zealand male cyclists
21st-century New Zealand people